This is a list of episodes for the fifth season (1954–55) of the television version of The Jack Benny Program.

Episodes

References
 
 

1954 American television seasons
1955 American television seasons
Jack 05